Lee Gee-hyeon (born 5 March 1996) is a South Korean footballer currently playing as a defender for Trayal.

Career statistics

Club

Notes

References

Living people
1996 births
South Korean footballers
South Korean expatriate footballers
Association football defenders
Serbian First League players
FK Zlatibor Čajetina players
South Korean expatriate sportspeople in Serbia
Expatriate footballers in Serbia